Soulkeeper is a Sci Fi Pictures original TV-movie  that premiered October 13, 2001 on the Sci Fi Channel.

Synopsis
After stealing Abraham Lincoln's stovepipe hat from a Civil War reenactment and then being subsequently dumped by their unseen boss "Mr M", thieves  Corey Mahoney (Rodney Rowland) and Terrence Christian (Kevin Patrick Walls) are at a loss until they are hired by the mysterious Pascal (Brad Dourif). His proposition is for them to acquire the Rock of Lazarus, an ancient relic capable of returning souls back to Earth. In return for this, he guarantees $8,000 up front and $100,000 when the job is done. However, troubles soon arise as they encounter demons and Simon Magus, an evil sorcerer believing he is the son of God.

Cast
 Rodney Rowland as Corey Mahoney
 Kevin Patrick Walls as Terrence Christian
 Robert Davi as Mallion
 Tommy "Tiny" Lister as Chad
 Brad Dourif as Pascal
 Karen Black as Martha "Magnificent Martha"
 William Bassett as Old Bum

Production
Blur Studio produced more than 100 digital visual-effects scenes and several 3D computer-animated characters for the telefilm.

References

External links

Syfy original films
2001 television films
2001 films
2000s English-language films
2000s American films